Anna Sergeyevna Sedoykina (born 1 August 1984) is a Russian handball player for CSKA Moscow and the Russian national handball team.

She received a bronze medal with the Russian team at the 2008 European Women's Handball Championship in Macedonia.

Individual awards 
Carpathian Trophy Best Goalkeeper: 2018

References

External links

Russian female handball players
1984 births
Living people
Sportspeople from Volgograd
Olympic handball players of Russia
Handball players at the 2012 Summer Olympics
Handball players at the 2016 Summer Olympics
Handball players at the 2020 Summer Olympics
Medalists at the 2016 Summer Olympics
Medalists at the 2020 Summer Olympics
Olympic gold medalists for Russia
Olympic medalists in handball
Olympic silver medalists for the Russian Olympic Committee athletes